The Daily Brahmanbaria is a Bangla-language daily newspaper that serves Brahmanbaria District in Bangladesh. The newspaper was founded in 1991. The editor is Md. Nurul Hossain, who has more than forty years of experience as an editor. The newspaper is also published as an online publication. It was first published in tabloid sized. It changed to a broad sized newspaper, published in black and white.

References

External links
 Official website

Brahmanbaria District
Bengali-language newspapers published in Bangladesh
Daily newspapers published in Bangladesh